Tony DiGerolamo (born Anthony M. DiGerolamo on March 9, 1966) is a comic book writer and Colonel Sanders impersonator from New Jersey.

Career
Tony DiGerolamo began his comics career in 1996 with the publication of his first comic book, "Jersey Devil #1", based on the Jersey Devil legend and several articles written in the South Jersey Courier-Post. It was published under his own imprint, South Jersey Rebellion Productions. Pencilled largely by Steven Cornicelli and inked by Bob Clark, "Jersey Devil #1" enjoyed modest sales. Replacing the art team, DiGerolamo recruited Dom LaGrutta, Jr. for the pencils and Donn Smith for the inks, giving "Jersey Devil #2" a cleaner look. Although the improvements continued to bring DiGerolamo and the SJRP strong local sales, comic fans largely ignored the comic. DiGerolamo's insistence on longer issues and multi-issue stories put a strain on his art team and forced him to recruit additional artists.

Around 1999, DiGerolamo launched what would become a more successful comic book, The Travelers, which was eventually picked up by Kenzer & Company at issue #4. With the changes of art teams, Jersey Devil was dropped by Diamond Distributors after issue #7 due to low sales. DiGerolamo struggled to keep the comic alive publishing issues 8 to 12 in mini-comic formats.

Now relieved of the financial burden of publication, DiGerolamo concentrated more on making The Travelers a success. The bimonthly schedule put a strain on artist Brian Dawson and the variety of inkers on the book, who included the Fraim Brothers. DiGerolamo also launched a four-issue mini-series called The Fix to coincide with a novel with the same character.

By issue 9, Dawson could no longer commit to The Travelers hectic schedule, so inker James Dunn took over the art chores for issues 10 and 11. Eventually, DiGerolamo found a new artist with Chris Moreno on the "Travelers #12". Sales peaked with The Travelers issue #14, which was a crossover with Knights of the Dinner Table Illustrated. Shortly thereafter, he took over the writing chores for another Kenzer comic called Everknights. DiGerolamo moved The Travelers to Wingnut Games with issue #21. By issue 22, Moreno could no longer keep doing the Travelers with his other comic work. DiGerolamo struggled with a series of other artists, with Moreno occasionally coming back to help with the art. The comic limped to the 25th issue before Wingnut had to cancel it.

By this time, DiGerolamo had landed side work with Bongo Comics writing for the Bart Simpson comics. His first story was a Lisa story entitled "A Chair of One's Own" in November 2002. While he continued to write for Bongo, he met the publishers at Silent Devil. Looking for another project that both he and Moreno could work on, the duo launched the Super Frat webcomic under Silent Devil's banner. In 2006, Silent Devil published its first compilation of Super Frat called "Super Frat: Rush Week Collection".

DiGerolamo continues to write screenplays and comic books in New Jersey. He is also the creator of "Complete Mafia" for d20 from Living Room Games and worked on an online zombie TV show called Zombie Country.  DiGerolamo currently works with Christian Beranek on a webcomic hub called The Webcomic Factory.

Books
The Wildsidhe Chronicles: Book 5: The Undercover Dragon 2003, Published by Padwolf Publishing.  (author)
The Fix: Fix In Overtime 2001, Published by Padwolf Publishing.  (author)
The Ralph Wiggum Book 2006, Published by Bongo.  (contributing writer)
F*ck You I'm Italian: Why We Italians Are Awesome 2018, Published by Ulysses Press.  (writer)
Wokeistan: A Novel 2019, Published by South Jersey Rebellion Productions. ASIN: B07TTWJ8WD (co-writer)
The Pineys: Book 1:  My Cousin, The Piney 2019, Published by South Jersey Rebellion Productions. ASIN: B07XVCWVCK (writer)

Comic books

The Simpsons
Bart Simpson #9: A Chair of One's Own (writer)
Bart Simpson #15: Bart Version 2.0, Invasion of the Baby Snatchers (writer)
Bart Simpson #19: Bartless on a Tuesday (writer)
Bart Simpson #21: Batter-Up Bart (writer)
Bart Simpson #22: Bait and Cackle (writer)
Bart Simpson #24: Guide to Grown-Up Nerds, The Kiss of Blecch!, The Maggie & Moe Mysteries! (writer)
Bart Simpson #28: Trimming the Hedges (writer)
Bart Simpson #30: The Great Train Wreck (writer)
Bart Simpson #31: Shopping for School Supplies the Bart Simpson Way!, The Maggie & Moe Mysteries! (writer)
Bart Simpson #33: Fort Knocks, A Load of Trouble (writer)
Bart Simpson #35: Today's Science Prank with Professor Frink, Barty & Milhousy (writer)
Bart Simpson #40: Attack of the 50-Foot Maggie (writer)
Bart Simpson #41: Angry Dad (writer)
Bart Simpson #45: Bartspace.com, The Maggie and Moe Mysteries: Naptime for Murder! (writer)
Bart Simpson #46: How Miss Hoover Got Her Groove Back (writer)
Bart Simpson #65: Gamemaster Lisa (writer)
Bart Simpson #72: The Prince and the Penal System (co-writer)
Bart Simpson #75: Angry Dad Flips His Lid (writer)
Bart Simpson #80: Kneading Dough (writer)
Bart Simpson #82: Springfield Babies (writer)
Bart Simpson #85: Angry Dad in The Last Beer (writer)
Bart Simpson #97: Bart Simpson Saves the Universe (writer)
Bart Simpson #98: Skateboard Renegade (writer)
Simpsons Comics #77: Homer vs. The Raccoon (writer)
Simpsons Comics #114: The Maggie and Moe Mysteries:  M is for Zirconia (writer)
Simpsons Comics #124: Angry Dad in The Roller Skate (writer)
Simpsons Comics #180: Angry Dad in Poppin' Mad (writer)
Simpsons Comics #182: Angry Dad in Changing the Tire (writer)
Simpsons Comics #183: Angry Dad in ATM Dad (writer)
Simpsons Comics #200: Moe Meets His Match (co-writer)
Simpsons Comics #226: The Bullies! (writer)
Simpsons Comics #229: The Moe and Otto Switcheroo (writer)
Simpsons Comics #230: Donut Detectives (writer)
Simpsons Comics #231: Bart the Rake (writer)
The Simpsons Winter Wingding #1: Angry Dad, Hot Cider in the City, Homer's New Year Resolutions (writer)
The Simpsons Winter Wingding #2: Otto's Gnarly Snowboarders Glossary, Brave Bart, Ralph vs. The Wild (writer)
The Simpsons Winter Wingding #6: Locked in a Brewery (writer)
The Simpsons Summer Shindig #1: Homer's Guide To The Beach!, Bart Simpson's Report On Francis Scott Key, Homer Beats the Heat, The Last Day of Summer Vacation (writer)
Li'l Homer #1: Late for School, Fish Story, Angry Kid in Stupid Kite (writer)
The Simpsons' Treehouse of Horror #22:  Ghost Bashers (writer)
Simpsons Illustrated:  #8, #12, #21, #23 (contributing writer)
Bongo Comics Free-for-All 2010, 2017 (contributing writer)

Image Comics
Outlaw Territory, Volume 3:  One Bullet for Three (contributing writer)

Campfire
Personal Reflections of Joan of Arc (adapted to graphic novel format, writer)

Creator-owned comics

Print
Tony Digerolamo's Jersey Devil #1-#12 (writer and creator)
Tony Digerolamo's The Fix #1-#4 (writer and creator)
Tony Digerolamo's The Travelers #1-#25 (writer creator)

Webcomics
Super Frat (writer) 
Post Apocalyptic Nick  (co-writer and co-creator with Christian Beranek)
Lester Crenshaw is Dead (writer and creator)

D20 game books
Tony Digerolamo's Complete Mafia for d20 2005, Published by Living Room Games.  (creator)
Lethal Legacies Traps of the World Before 2006, Published by Goodman Games.  (writer)
Tony Digerolamo's Complete Mafia for d20 West Coast Edition 2008, Published by The Le Games. (creator)

Filmography
Allergic to Cats 2016 (writer)
Mafioso: The Father, The Son 2004 (writer)
10 Cents a Minute 2001 (writer)
The Evil Within 1998 (written by)
Life with the Dice Bag  2004 (Actor: Self)

References

Comic Vine
Comic Book Data Base
Bongo Comics

External links
DiGerolamo's website
The Webcomic Factory
Hanging with the Super Frat on Pulse
The Travelers
Tony DiGerolamo interview at the New York Comicon
Tony DiGerolamo interview with Super Hero Speak

Living people
1966 births
American male screenwriters
Writers from New Jersey